Leśniewo  is a village in the administrative district of Gmina Srokowo, within Kętrzyn County, Warmian-Masurian Voivodeship, in northern Poland, close to the border with the Kaliningrad Oblast of Russia.

The village has a population of 330.

To the northwest of the village there is Diabla Góra. To the west of the village there is the Masurian Canal, near the village there are two unfinished sluices: Leśniewo Górne and Leśniewo Dolne. Both were constructed during the period of German Empire in 1906 and continued in the Nazi Germany period in the 1940s. Because of both World Wars, both attempts did not manage to finish those sluices.  A legend says that they were to be used for U-boats that would sail for repairs through the canal inland or for barges. It is not known what would they be used for exactly. They are about 45 meters long in their current state. Had it been finished it could have been larger. Today it is a tourist attraction.

References

Villages in Kętrzyn County